is a Japanese footballer who plays as a goalkeeper for  club Roasso Kumamoto.

Youth career
Tashiro started his career at Yokohama Junior SC and went on to attend Nihon University Fujisawa High School. In 2017, he joined Kokushikan University and would be playing in the JUFA Kanto League 2. He made his debut for the university in May 2019, in a 4–3 victory over Rikkyo University and kept his fist clean sheet in the following game in a 2–0 win over Tokai University. He played a total of 6 times during the 2019 season. In 2020, he was named as captain of the team following Kokushikan's promotion to JUFA Kanto League 1. He went on to play 9 times that season, keeping three clean sheets.

Club career
In December 2020, it was announced that Tashiro would be signing for J3 League team Roasso Kumamoto for the 2021 season and he was handed the number 1 shirt. He did not make any appearances in his debut season, however Kumamoto did win the 2021 J3 League and were promoted back to the J2 League after a three-season absence.

He made his debut for the club in March 2022 and kept a clean sheet, in a 2–0 J2 League win over V-Varen Nagasaki. He only made 5 appearances across all competitions in the 2022 season, as he was unable to take the place of veteran first-choice goalkeeper Yuya Sato.

Career statistics

Club

References

External links
Profile at Roasso Kumamoto
Profile at J.League

1998 births
Living people
Japanese footballers
Association football goalkeepers
Association football people from Kanagawa Prefecture
Kokushikan University alumni
Roasso Kumamoto players
J2 League players